Ronald Lawrence Kovic (born July 4, 1946) is an American anti-war activist, writer, and United States Marine Corps sergeant who was wounded and paralyzed in the Vietnam War. His 1976 memoir Born on the Fourth of July was made into the Academy Award–winning 1989 film directed by Oliver Stone.

Kovic received the Golden Globe Award for Best Screenplay on January 20, 1990, 22 years to the day that he was wounded in Vietnam, and was nominated for an Academy Award in the same category.

Early life

Kovic was born in Ladysmith, Wisconsin, the second of six children  of Patricia Ann Lamb (January 6, 1923 – June 30, 2006) and Eli Thomas Kovic (August 3, 1920 – May 1, 1999). Eli Thomas Kovic met Lamb while serving in the Navy during the Second World War after both enlisted shortly after the 1941 attack on Pearl Harbor. Eli was of Croatian ancestry, while Patricia was of Irish ancestry, and a housewife.

Military service in Vietnam
Kovic volunteered to serve in Vietnam, and was sent to South Vietnam in December 1965 as a member of H&S Company, 3rd Battalion, 7th Marines, 1st Marine Division. In June 1966, he was transferred to Bravo Company, Second Platoon, 1st Reconnaissance Battalion, 1st Marine Division where he participated in 22 long range reconnaissance patrols in enemy territory and was awarded the Navy Commendation Medal with Combat V for valor. After a 13-month tour of duty, he returned home on January 15, 1967. He was subsequently assigned to the 2nd Marine Aircraft Wing at Cherry Point, North Carolina. Several months later, he volunteered to return to Vietnam for a second tour of duty.

On January 20, 1968, while leading a reconnaissance force of battalion scouts from the 1st Amtrac Battalion just north of the Cửa Việt River in the vicinity of the village of Mỹ Lộc, in the Demilitarized Zone, Kovic's squad came into contact with the NVA 803rd Regiment and elements of a Viet Cong battalion that was besieging the village; he was shot by NVA soldiers while leading his rifle squad across an open area, attempting to aid the South Vietnamese Popular Force unit in the village. Deserted by most of his unit, he was shot first in the right foot, which tore out the back of his heel, then again through the right shoulder, suffering a collapsed lung and a spinal cord injury that left him paralyzed from the chest down. The first Marine that tried to save him was shot through the heart and killed, before a second Marine carried Kovic to safety through heavy enemy fire. Kovic then spent a week in an intensive care ward in Da Nang. As a result of his service and injuries in the conflict, Kovic was awarded the Bronze Star with Combat "V" for heroism in battle and the Purple Heart.

Post-Vietnam activism

Before the end of the war in Vietnam was declared on April 30, 1975, Kovic became one of the best-known peace activists among the Vietnam veterans, and was arrested 12 times for political protesting. He attended his first peace demonstration soon after the Kent State shootings in May 1970, and gave his first speech against the war at Levittown Memorial High School in Levittown, Long Island, New York that same spring. Kovic's speech that day was interrupted by a bomb threat and the auditorium was cleared.

Undeterred, Kovic continued speaking to students from the school's football grandstands. His first arrest was during an anti-Vietnam War demonstration at an Orange County, California draft board in the spring of 1971. He refused to leave the office of the draft board, explaining to a representative that, by sending young men to Vietnam, they were inadvertently "condemning them to their death", or to be wounded and maimed like himself in a war that he had come to believe was "immoral and made no sense". He was told that, if he did not leave the draft board immediately, he would be arrested. Kovic refused to leave and was taken away by police.

In 1974, Kovic led a group of disabled Vietnam War veterans in wheelchairs on a 17-day hunger strike inside the Los Angeles office of Senator Alan Cranston. The veterans protested the "poor treatment in America's veterans' hospitals and demanded better treatment for returning veterans, a full investigation of all Veterans Administration (VA) facilities, and a face-to-face meeting with the head of the VA, Donald E. Johnson. The strike continued to escalate until Johnson finally agreed to fly out from Washington, D.C., and meet with the veterans. The hunger strike ended soon after that. Several months later, Johnson resigned. In late August 1974, Kovic traveled to Belfast, Northern Ireland, where he spent a week in the Catholic stronghold of "Turf Lodge," interviewing both political activists and residents. In the spring of 1975, Kovic, author Richard Boyle, and photo journalist Loretta Smith traveled to cover the Cambodian Civil War in Cambodia for Pacific News Service.

On the night of July 15th, 1976, at the Democratic National Convention at Madison Square Garden in New York City Kovic spoke from the podium seconding the nomination of draft resister Fritz Efaw for Vice President of the United States.  

In 1990, Kovic considered running for a seat in the House of Representatives against California Republican Bob Dornan. Kovic ultimately decided not to run.

From 1990 to 1991, Kovic took part in several anti-war demonstrations against the first Gulf War, which occurred not long after the release of his biographical film in 1989. In early May 1999, following the U.S. bombing of the Chinese embassy in Belgrade, Yugoslavia, Kovic met with China's ambassador to the United States Li Zhaoxing at the Chinese embassy in Washington, D.C. to express his condolences and present the ambassador and his staff with two dozen red roses. He was an outspoken critic of the Iraq War.

Since 2000
In November 2003, Kovic joined protests in London against the visit of George W. Bush. He was the guest of honor at a reception held at London's city hall by Mayor Ken Livingstone. The following day, he led a march of several hundred thousand demonstrators on Trafalgar Square, where a huge rally was held to protest the visit of George W. Bush and the war in Iraq. Kovic attended the 2008 Democratic National Convention in Denver, Colorado. On Sunday, August 24, 2008, the day before the convention began, Kovic spoke, then led thousands in a march against the war which ended with him saying, "In the city of Denver, we got welcomed home."

In a new introduction to his book, Born on the Fourth of July (1976), written in March 2005, Kovic stated, "I wanted people to understand. I wanted to share with them as nakedly and openly and intimately as possible what I had gone through, what I had endured. I wanted them to know what it really meant to be in a war, to be shot and wounded, to be fighting for my life on the intensive care ward, not the myth we had grown up believing. I wanted people to know about the hospitals and the enema room, about why I had become opposed to the war, why I had grown more and more committed to peace and nonviolence. I had been beaten by the police and arrested twelve times for protesting the war and I had spent many nights in jail in my wheelchair. I had been called a Communist and a traitor, simply for trying to tell the truth about what had happened in that war, but I refused to be intimidated." In 1989, on the last day of filming Born on the Fourth of July, Kovic presented actor Tom Cruise, who portrayed him in the movie, the original Bronze Star he had received, explaining to Cruise that he was giving him the medal as a gift "for his heroic performance".

Kovic lives in Redondo Beach, California, where he writes, paints, plays the piano, and gardens. He had a relationship with Connie Panzarino (author of The Me in the Mirror).

Legacy
Bruce Springsteen wrote the song "Shut Out the Light" after reading Kovic's memoir and then meeting him.

Military Awards: Bronze Star with Combat V, Purple Heart, Navy Commendation Medal with Combat V, Vietnam Service Medal, National Defense Service Medal, Vietnam Campaign Medal, Good Conduct Medal.

Personal life
Kovic is the uncle of internet personality Adam Kovic.

Films

1989 – Born on the Fourth of July - (co-screenwriter with Oliver Stone). Directed by Oliver Stone. Kovic also has a brief cameo appearance in the film as a wheelchair-using soldier in the opening parade scene, who flinches as firecrackers explode, something Tom Cruise's Kovic will also do later in the film.

See also

 
 
 
 List of Croatian Americans
 List of peace activists
 
 
 Pavel Filatyev

References

External links

 
 
 Kovic, Ron. "Born on the Fourth of July: The Long Journey Home", AlterNet, posted June 13, 2005.
  "Veterans Speak Out", truthout.org, video, November 14, 2005.
 Gilmer, Tim. "Ron Kovic Reborn", profile from the Independent Media Institute, June 20, 2003.
 CNN interview with Kovic: "Peace movement will be largest ever", January 17, 2003.
 "Ron Kovic Vietnam Veteran", Heroism Project profile.
 Kovic, Ron. "The Forgotten Wounded of Iraq", TruthDig.com, January 18, 2006.
 Kovic, Ron. "Breaking the Silence of the Night", TruthDig.com, October 10, 2006.
 Fanucci, Kenneth. "It's All Coming Together For Ron Kovic", S.F. Examiner, June 25, 1978.
 Eterovich, Adam S. "Croatians in California, 1849–1999", Ragusan Press, San Carlos, CA, 2000, p 600, 

1946 births
Activists from California
American anti–Iraq War activists
American anti–Vietnam War activists
American autobiographers
American people of Croatian descent
American shooting survivors
American writers of Irish descent
Best Screenplay Golden Globe winners
Hofstra University alumni
Living people
People from Ladysmith, Wisconsin
People from Massapequa, New York
People from Redondo Beach, California
People with paraplegia
United States Marine Corps personnel of the Vietnam War
United States Marines
Writers from California
Writers from New York (state)
Writers from Wisconsin